Andre Volsteedt (born 6 May 1975) is a South African cricketer. He played in thirteen first-class and two List A matches from 1993/94 to 1998/99.

References

External links
 

1975 births
Living people
South African cricketers
Boland cricketers
Free State cricketers
Cricketers from Bloemfontein